The Seoul National University of Education (SNUE) is a government-run institution which provides training for future public elementary school teachers in South Korea. Founded in May 1946 under the name of Kyunggi Public Regular School, the university is the first national university that specializes in elementary school teacher training. SNUE is the top university of education in South Korea indisputably.

The campus is located in the Seocho-gu district of Seoul, the capital of South Korea. The university offers graduate and undergraduate programs, and has an attached elementary school.

History

The school was originally founded as Kyunggi Public Teacher’s School on May 22, 1946. The attached elementary school, which functions as a research school for teachers-in-training and researchers, opened on March 1, 1953. On March 1, 1962, the university was incorporated into an annex of Seoul National University. 
In 1977, the campus moved to its current location in Seocho-gu, Seoul.
The school has expanded throughout the years into various institutes and support centers, such as the International Language Institute and the Center for the Education of Gifted Children in Science.
After a series of name changes due to organizational shifts over the years, Seoul National University of Education was decided upon in 1993. Shortly thereafter in 1996, SNUE established its Graduate School of Education.

History Timetable

Academics

Undergraduate College

Due to the university's specialized purpose, the undergraduate college only offers one major: Elementary Education.

Students do have choices in Specialized Courses, which cover deeper educational techniques in various areas such as:

 Ethics Education
 Korean Language Education
 Social Studies Education
 Mathematics Education
 Science Education
 Physical Education
 Music Education
 Fine Arts Education
 Practical Arts Education
 Elementary Education
 English Education
 Computer Education
 Early Childhood and Special Education

Graduate school

The SNUE Graduate School aims to train teachers specializing in elementary education. It also promotes various fields and specialties, continuing education, and the improvement of academic abilities for elementary school teachers. It offers the following majors:

 Elementary Ethics Education
 Elementary Korean Language Education
 Elementary Social Studies Education
 Elementary Mathematics Education
 Elementary Science Education
 Elementary Physical Education
 Elementary Music Education
 Elementary Fine Arts Education
 Elementary Education Methods
 Elementary English Education
 Elementary Computer Education
 Elementary Practical Arts Education
 Elementary Educational Administration
 Elementary Counseling Education
 Elementary Environmental Education
 Elementary Unified Education
 Global & Cultural Studies Education
 Early Childhood Education

TESOL Courses
SNUE also has an active TESOL program consisting of a standard attendance program along with a Saturday only course for students who are unable to follow the regular course. The course was designed to give both native and non-native English teachers the skills to teach effectively in the classroom. SNUE's TESOL program is delivered in conjunction with the Australian Griffith University and the two universities also conduct overseas trips for further training between Seoul, South Korea and Brisbane, Australia.
The TESOL program is currently under the oversight of one Western professor. 
 Adrian Cohen

Campus
SNUE is located at Seocho-dong, Seocho-gu, in the southern part of Seoul. While this part of Seoul was a newly developing area with scarce population and lower land value back in '77 (when the campus was established), the area is now the opposite after its rapid development in the '70-'80's.

Dormitory
The dormitory is for students from provincial areas. It helps SNUE students to experience a successful group life by encouraging autonomy and discipline. It has convenient facilities such as a lobby, a reading room, bathrooms, cooking facilities, a seminar room, a physical exercise room, a water purifier, pianos, and more. Freshmen generally are given a priority admission to the dormitory (50% of the total capacity). Dormitory members are arranged according to the year and personal preferences.

Attached Elementary School
The attached elementary school is an experimental research school for effective teaching practices and performance policy, as judged by the Ministry of Education. It offers compulsory elementary education, substantial studies, and activities that provide guidance for Intern Teachers, analysis and application of experimental textbooks, experimental application and generalization of the curriculum, experimental research of various educational policies, and workshops for teachers to reform the classroom. The school also has special educational support programs, such as the operation of classes for Korean students from other countries, active education of folk art, education for special aptitude with varied learning through hands-on experience and ICT (information, communication & technology) education.

Public transit access
The campus is served by Seoul Nat'l Univ. of Education Station, a transit station between Seoul Subway Line 2 and 3.

Seoul Express Bus Terminal and Seoul Nambu Bus Terminal are a station away from the campus, making the campus accessible for students from outer-Seoul area.

Student life
Student life in SNUE is quite different from that of other universities. Due to the university's status as a specialized institution, students already have a set curriculum laid out for all four years. For example, freshmen students only get to choose 3 classes out of 10 classes they attend their first semester.

Students who share the same specialized course form a Class, and the Class remains the same until they graduate. Students in a Class usually attend the same lectures (except few selective ones)and participate in other activities together for 4 years.

While this has some disadvantages, such as a limited opportunity for broader social engagement, students often form a tight cohort within their class. This cohort is advantageous, as the students will often go into the same highly-specialized field of education.

Controversies
SNUE made headlines when President Song Kwang-yong was quoted in the October 28, 2009, edition of The Korea Times as claiming that teachers from Western nations "are not qualified and are often involved in sexual harassment and drugs". Song later clarified that the quote was fabricated by Kang Shin-who, a journalist who has been previously criticized for misquoting interviewees or fabricating quotes.

See also
List of national universities in South Korea
List of universities and colleges in South Korea
Education in Korea

References

External links
Seoul National University of Education English Website

Seocho District
Universities and colleges in Seoul
National universities of education in South Korea
Educational institutions established in 1946
1946 establishments in Korea